The Sri Lanka national cricket team toured Zimbabwe in November 2008 to play 5 Limited Overs Internationals.

It was the first international series for new Zimbabwe coach Walter Chawaguta.</ref>

ODI series

1st ODI

2nd ODI

3rd ODI

4th ODI

5th ODI

Tour Matches

First Class:TBC v Sri Lankans

List A:TBC v Sri Lankans

References

External links

2008 in Sri Lankan cricket
2008 in Zimbabwean cricket
International cricket competitions in 2008–09
2008-09
Zimbabwean cricket seasons from 2000–01